The 1st Special Service Force was an elite American–Canadian commando unit in World War II, under the command of the United States Fifth Army. The unit was organized in 1942 and trained at Fort William Henry Harrison near Helena, Montana, in the United States. The Force served in the Aleutian Islands, and fought in Italy, and southern France before being disbanded in December 1944.

The modern American and Canadian special operations forces trace their heritage to this unit. In 2013, the United States Congress passed a bill to award the 1st Special Service Force the Congressional Gold Medal.

History

Background
Geoffrey Pyke was an English journalist, educationalist, and later an inventor whose clever, but unorthodox, ideas could be difficult to implement. In lifestyle and appearance, he fit the common stereotype of a scientist-engineer-inventor or in British slang, a "boffin". This was part of the British approach in World War II, of encouraging innovative warfare methods and weapons, that was personally backed by Churchill. Hobart's Funnies are another example.

While working for the British Combined Operations Command, Pyke devised a plan for the creation of a small, elite force capable of fighting behind enemy lines in winter conditions. This was to have been a commando unit that could be landed, by sea or air, into occupied Norway, Romania and/or the Italian Alps on sabotage missions against hydroelectric plants and oil fields.

In Norway, the chief industrial threat was the creation of the heavy water used in the German atomic weapon research at Rjukan. Furthermore, attacks on Norwegian power stations, which supplied the country with 49% of its power, might drive the Axis powers out of the country and give the Allies a direct link to Russia. In Romania, there were the strategically important Ploiești oil fields that met one quarter of the Germans' consumption, and Italian hydroelectric plants powered most of south German industry. Pyke requested that a tracked vehicle be developed especially for the unit, capable of carrying men and their equipment at high speed across snow-covered terrain.

Project Plough
In March 1942 Pyke proposed an idea, which he had named Project Plough, to Lord Louis Mountbatten, Chief of Combined Operations Headquarters (COHQ) that Allied commandos be parachuted into the Norwegian mountains to establish a covert base on the Jostedalsbreen, a large glacier plateau in German-occupied Norway, for guerrilla actions against the German army of occupation. Equipped with Pyke's proposed snow vehicle, they would attack strategic targets, such as hydroelectric power plants. Pyke persuaded Mountbatten that such a force would be virtually invulnerable in its glacier strongholds and would tie down large numbers of German troops trying to dislodge it.

However, given the demands upon both Combined Operations and British industry, it was decided to offer it instead to the United States at the Chequers Conference of March 1942. General George Marshall, Chief of Staff of the United States Army, accepted the suggestion for Project Plough. In April 1942, since no suitable vehicle existed, the U.S. government asked automobile manufacturers to look into such a design. Studebaker subsequently created the T-15 cargo carrier, which later became the M29 Weasel.

In May 1942, the concept papers for Plough were scrutinized by Major Robert T. Frederick, a young officer in the Operations Division of the U.S. General Staff. Frederick predicted Plough would be a military fiasco on the following grounds. Firstly, he argued that Plough endeavored to achieve unrealistic objectives with the number of troops that the plan called for. Similarly, he argued that the small, elite division would be outnumbered and overtaken in any defensive attempts to hold an area once it was captured. Furthermore, Frederick concluded that there was no concrete way to evacuate the troops after a mission. This would have required significant troop lift and covering fighter support. All vehicles and equipment would have had to be abandoned. Finally, the plan had called for troops to be parachute dropped by airplane to their targets, which Frederick said was impossible at the moment, as there were no planes to fly the men into Norway. Additionally, significant aircraft would be necessary to drop the Weasels and resupply the force. Ultimately, he concluded that a small squad of elite men would not do enough damage to justify the risk of putting them into battle and instead proposed a series of strategic bombings to achieve the plan's objectives.

Generals Marshall and Eisenhower had already discussed Plough with the British High Command and were unwilling to compromise a chance to open an American front in Europe. It was believed that Plough offered the possibility of defeating the Germans, and the Americans wanted allied efforts to shift to the Pacific Theater. The sooner the Germans were defeated, it was argued, the sooner this would become a reality.

The first officer picked to lead the unit, Lieutenant Colonel Howard R. Johnson, did not get along well with Pyke. Johnson was transferred after arguing with Mountbatten and Eisenhower about the feasibility of the plan. (Johnson went on to form and command the 501st Parachute Infantry Regiment.) He was replaced by Frederick, following a suggestion by Mountbatten, which was approved by Eisenhower. Frederick was given the task of creating a fighting unit for Project Plough and was promoted to colonel to command it. By July 1942 Frederick had eased Pyke out of the picture.

The First Special Service Force was activated on 9 July 1942 as a joint Canadian-U.S. force of three small regiments and a service battalion, directly answerable to the joint Chiefs of Staff. U.S. Army. Fort William Henry Harrison in Helena, Montana, was chosen as the primary training location, due to its flat terrain for airborne training and its close proximity to mountains for ski and winter training.

Frederick enjoyed a very high priority in obtaining equipment and training areas. Originally, due to its winter warfare mission, it had been intended that the unit should be equally made up of American, Canadian, and Norwegian troops. However, a lack of suitable Norwegians saw this changed to half American and half Canadian.

Canadian recruitment 
In July 1942, the Canadian Minister of National Defence, James Ralston, approved the assignment of 697 officers and enlisted men for Project Plough, under the guise that they were forming Canada's first airborne unit, the 1st Canadian Parachute Battalion (1CPB).

Due to a decision to raise an actual Canadian parachute battalion, the Canadian volunteers for Project Plough were also sometimes known unofficially as the "2nd Canadian Parachute Battalion". (The Canadians did not officially become a unit until April–May 1943, under the designation, 1st Canadian Special Service Battalion.)

While its members remained part of the Canadian Army, subject to its code of discipline and paid by the Canadian government, they were to be supplied with uniforms, equipment, food, shelter and travel expenses by the U.S. Army. It was agreed that a Canadian would serve as second in command of the force and that half of the officers and initially one-half of the enlisted men would be Canadian. As casualties reduced the size of the Force, restrictions on the availability of Canadian replacements reduced the proportion of the Canadian contingent to about one-third of the total. After Lieutenant Colonel McQueen, the senior Canadian member, broke his leg during parachute training, the highest ranking Canadian in the force was Lieutenant Colonel Don Williamson, who commanded the 2nd Regiment.

U.S. recruitment 
The U.S. volunteers for the force consisted initially of officers from Forts Belvoir and Benning.

Letters of recruitment were posted to all U.S. Army units in the Southwest and on the Pacific coast. The letters called for single men, aged 21–35 with three or more years of grammar school. Occupations preferred: Rangers, lumberjacks, northwoodsmen, hunters, prospectors, explorers and game wardens. Inspection teams also scoured the western camps for ideal candidates. Those chosen, owing to the secrecy of the mission, were often told that they had been selected to undergo training for a parachute unit. Indeed, the unit was so secretive, that many soldiers did not know where they were when they arrived in Helena for training, as the windows of the trains carrying the troops were painted black.

The combat force was to be made up of three regiments. Each regiment was led by a lieutenant colonel and 32 officers and boasted a force of 385 men. The regiments were divided into two battalions with three companies in each battalion and three platoons in each company. The platoon was then broken up into two sections.

Following initial training period in Montana, the FSSF relocated to Camp Bradford, Virginia, on 15 April 1943, and to Fort Ethan Allen, Vermont, on 23 May 1943.

Aleutian Islands, 1943
It was decided that the FSSF would be utilized against Japanese forces occupying islands off Alaska. The FSSF arrived at the San Francisco Port of Embarkation on 4 July 1943.

On 10 July the Devil's Brigade sailed for the Aleutian Islands off Alaska. On 15 August 1943, 1st SSF was part of the invasion force of the island of Kiska, but after discovering the island had been recently evacuated by Japanese forces, it re-embarked and left ship at Camp Stoneman, California, and returned to Fort Ethan Allen, arriving 9 September 1943.

Italy, 1943
In late 1943, the original Project Plough (with its target as Norway) was abandoned, but in October 1943, the commander of the United States Fifth Army, Lieutenant General Mark W. Clark, brought the 1st Special Service Force to Italy where its members demonstrated the value of their unique skills and training. The Devil's Brigade arrived in Casablanca in French Morocco in November 1943 and quickly moved to the Italian front arriving at Naples on 19 November 1943 and immediately going into the line with the U.S. 36th Infantry Division.

The force was tasked with taking two heavily fortified German positions in the Italian mountains; one at Monte La Difensa and the other at Monte La Remetanea. These positions were controlled by the 104th Panzer Grenadier Regiment with the 1st Fallschirm-Panzer Division Hermann Göring in reserve (the former an infantry formation, the latter an armored division). The importance of these mountains lay in their position relative to Hitler's Gustav Line. The German Winter line positioned on La Difensa and Remetanea were the last entrenched line before the Gustav and an allied push through the mountains would enable them to advance closer to Rome. Strategically, the mountains provided a commanding view of the countryside and highway, giving German artillery on the mountain control of the surrounding area. The German artillery atop La Defensa were also using a new weapon - the Nebelwerfer. The paths leading up La Difensa were heavily scouted by the force prior to their attack and it was reported to Lt. Col. T.C. MacWilliam (who would lead the 2nd regiment's assault on Remetanea) that the best way to approach the entrenched enemy was up an almost vertical escarpment over the right of the hill mass. In doing this, the force hoped to catch the Germans off guard, as previous allied attacks on the mountain had met the enemy head on.

The assault was planned for 2 December, while the men were trained in mountain climbing and fighting tactics at their temporary barracks at Santa Maria. The plan was as follows (all regiments were in the 1st Company): At 16:30 hours on 1 December 2nd Regiment would be trucked to within  of the base of the mountain and march the rest of the way to La Difensa (6-hour march). 1st Regiment, coupled with U.S. 36th Infantry Division would be the reserve units for the 2nd Regiment. 3rd Regiment would be split in two, half to supply the 2nd Regiment following the initial assault and the other half to be reserves with the 1st Regiment and 36th Infantry Division. All identification on Force soldiers was to be removed except their dog tags.

After reaching the base of the mountain and having had a single night's rest, 2nd Regiment (600 men total) began their ascent of La Difensa on 2 December at dusk under cover of a heavy artillery barrage. One soldier recalls the severity of the shelling: "It looked as if we were marching into Hell. The whole mountain was being shelled and the whole mountain seemed to be on fire".

The men climbed with ropes tied to one another in the freezing rain. Upon reaching the top, MacWilliam signaled his men to move forward into a depression in front of the German entrenchment. Initially, the soldiers were given the order to hold their fire until 6am, but the Germans were made aware of the allied positions after members of the force tripped over loose gravel while moving along the mountaintop. German shot flares into the air and the battle began. Through gun and mortar fire, the men of the 2nd Regiment managed to set up machine guns and return fire, surprising and overwhelming the Germans. The 5th Army Staff had guessed that the battle would last between 4–5 days, but within two hours, the Germans on La Difensa had retreated to La Remetanea.

Previously, American and British forces had suffered many casualties in futile attempts to take the important Camino Ridge. The 1st SSF was successful in taking their initial objective of La Defensa but were delayed in obtaining their actual objective of Monte La Remetanea (Hill 907). The attack on 907 was halted after the death of the 1st Battalion CO Lt. Col. T.C. MacWilliam. While he desired that the force momentum continue, Frederick ordered a halt in the advance on 907 in order to wait for reinforcements and supplies. The force dug in at Difensa, anticipating a German counterattack.

However, massive allied artillery barrages and the flooding of both the Rapido and Garigliano rivers prevented the Germans from reforming. While waiting for the orders to attack Remetanea, the 2nd Regiment were resupplied by the 1st and 3rd Regiments, who brought them whiskey and condoms (to keep the barrels of their guns dry in the rain). Once the British forces broke through the German lines at Monte Camino, the force was ordered to attack their primary objective (Hill 907). The successful assault on Difensa was the basis for the 1968 motion picture titled The Devil's Brigade.

The 1st SSF immediately continued its attack, assaulting Monte La Remetanea from 6 to 9 December. It captured Hill 720, starting from Monte Sammucro on 25 December, and after difficulties assaulted Monte Majo and Monte Vischiataro almost simultaneously on 8 January 1944.

During the mountain campaign the 1st SSF suffered 77% casualties: 511 total, 91 dead, 9 missing, 313 wounded with 116 exhaustion cases. They were relieved by the 142nd Infantry.

Anzio, 1944

Following the Québec Conference in August 1943, General Dwight D. Eisenhower was moved to London to plan for the Normandy landings. Command of the Mediterranean Theater was given to British General Henry Maitland Wilson. General Sir Harold Alexander, commanding the Allied Armies in Italy, had formulated the plan to land Allied troops at Anzio in order to outflank German positions in the area. German Field Marshal Albert Kesselring commanded the four German divisions at Anzio, which included the Hermann Goering Division and the 35th Panzer Grenadier Regiment of the 16th SS Panzergrenadier Division Reichsführer-SS Division. Combined German and Italian strength at Anzio was an estimated 70,000 men.

The Special Force brigade was withdrawn from the mountains in January and on 1 February was landed at the beachhead created by Operation Shingle at Anzio, south of Rome, replacing the 1st and 3rd Ranger Battalions, which had suffered heavy losses at the Battle of Cisterna. Their task was to hold and raid from the right-hand flank of the beachhead marked by the Mussolini Canal/Pontine Marshes. 1st Regiment was positioned on the force's right front, which comprised one-third of the entire line, while the 3rd Regiment guarded the remaining two-thirds of the line. 2nd Regiment, which had been reduced to three companies following the attacks on La Difensa, Sammucio and Majo, were tasked with running night patrols into Axis territory. The force's constant night raids forced Kesselring to fortify the German positions in their area with more men than he had originally planned. Reconnaissance missions performed by the Devils often went as deep as  behind enemy lines.

Frederick was greatly admired by the soldiers of the First Special Service Force for his willingness to fight alongside the men in battle. On the beachhead in Anzio, for example, a nighttime Force patrol walked into a German minefield and was pinned down by machine gun fire. Colonel Frederick ran into battle and assisted the litter bearers in clearing the wounded Force members.

German prisoners were often surprised at how few men the force actually contained. A captured German lieutenant admitted to being under the assumption that the force was a division. Indeed, General Frederick ordered several trucks to move around the forces area in order to give the enemy the impression that the force comprised more men than it actually did. An order was found on another prisoner that stated that the Germans in Anzio would be "fighting an elite Canadian-American Force. They are treacherous, unmerciful and clever. You cannot afford to relax. The first soldier or group of soldiers capturing one of these men will be given a 10-day furlough."

It was at Anzio that the 1st Special Service Force inspired the "Black Devils" nickname, which appears to have been an invention of the Force's intelligence officers. There is no record of any German ever referring to the Force as "The Devil's Brigade". They were referred to as "black" devils because the brigade's members smeared their faces with black boot polish for their covert operations in the dark of the night. During Anzio, the 1st SSF fought for 99 days without relief. It was also at Anzio that the 1st SSF used their trademark stickers; during night patrols soldiers would carry stickers depicting the unit patch and a slogan written in German: "Das dicke Ende kommt noch," said to translate colloquially to "The worst is yet to come". Its literal translation is actually "The thick end is coming soon", implying that a larger force was on its way imminently, placing these stickers on German corpses and fortifications. Canadian and American members of the Special Force who lost their lives are buried near the beach in the Commonwealth Anzio War Cemetery and the American Cemetery in Nettuno, just east of Anzio.

When the U.S. Fifth Army's breakout offensive began on 25 May 1944, the 1st SSF was sent against Monte Arrestino, and attacked Rocca Massima on 27 May. The 1st SSF was given the assignment of capturing seven bridges in the city to prevent their demolition by the withdrawing Wehrmacht. During the night of 4 June, members of the 1st SSF entered Rome, one of the first Allied units to do so. After they secured the bridges, they quickly moved north in pursuit of the retreating Germans.

In August 1944 1st SSF came under the command of Colonel Edwin Walker when Brigadier General Frederick, who had commanded the force since its earliest days, left on promotion to major general to command the 1st Airborne Task Force.

France, 1944
On 14 August 1944, the 1st SSF landed on the islands of Port Cros and Île du Levant during Operation Dragoon, the invasion of southern France. They fought the small Battle of Port Cros in which they captured the five forts on the islands from the German Army. Nine men were killed in action or died of wounds received in combat. On 22 August it was attached to the 1st Airborne Task Force, a provisional Seventh Army airborne division, and later made part of the Task Force. On 7 September it moved with the 1st Airborne Task Force to defensive positions on the Franco-Italian border. During the war the 1,800-man unit accounted for some 12,000 German casualties, captured some 7,000 prisoners, and sustained an attrition rate of over 600%.

Disbandment, 1944
The 1st SSF was disbanded 5 December 1944 in a field near Villeneuve-Loubet, on the extreme southeast Mediterranean coast of France. Villeneuve-Loubet holds a special place in the history of the force, not only because the unit was broken up there, but also because it is one of the villages that the 1st SSF had the hardest time capturing in southern France, on 26 August 1944. The day the unit was disbanded, the American commander held a parade honouring the unit. To end the ceremony, the Canadian elements were dismissed by being honoured by the American troops with a Pass in Review, eyes right, officers salute. After the unit's break up, the Canadians were sent to other Canadian units (most of them became replacements for the 1st Canadian Parachute Battalion). Some American members were sent to airborne divisions as replacements, others to Ranger Battalions, and still others formed the 474th Infantry Regiment, which served with the Third United States Army and performed occupation duty in Norway. United States Army Special Forces Groups (lineal descendants of 1st Special Service Force) celebrate Menton Day every 5 December with their Canadian military comrades and surviving members of the force. Usually there is a combined parachute jump, a pass in review, and a formal ball.

Training and equipment 
Since the unit needed to be trained quickly, the soldiers began parachuting within 48 hours of their arrival in Helena, Montana. The camp had no training towers and preliminary flights were not carried out, so for many this was their first experience at jumping. This training was completed before any other because it was believed that if all the soldiers earned their jumping badges simultaneously a sense of camaraderie would develop within the camp.

The men were on a strict and physically demanding three phase training schedule:
1) From August to October: parachuting, weapons and demolitions usage, small unit tactics and physical training.
2) From October to November: unit tactics and problem solving.
3) From November to July: skiing, rock climbing, adaptation to cold climates and operation of the M29 Weasel.

The weekly training schedule comprised reveille at 04:30 from Monday to Saturday followed by breakfast at 06:30. The obstacle course was run by 08:00 four times a week followed by the day's training, which differed depending on the month. Soldiers were expected to march double time between training exercises in order to adhere to the strict schedule. Training lectures were given by veterans of overseas wars in the evenings from Monday to Friday. Soldiers were given Saturday evenings and Sundays off. Most of the men went into Helena to relax on their days off.

Marches were done on a  course, the record for which was held by Colonel Marshall's First Regiment, who completed it in twenty hours. The force trained with enemy weapons, taking them apart, reassembling and shooting them until they were as proficient with them as with their own.

The hand-to-hand combat instructor was Dermot (Pat) O'Neill, an ex-Shanghai International Police Officer, who was an expert at unarmed combat. O'Neill, who was well-versed in several forms of martial arts, taught the men to attack the eyes, throat, groin and knees. He also taught knife fighting tactics and showed the men how to quick-draw their pistols. The men attacked one another with unsheathed bayonets as part of the training exercises and injuries were common.

Ski training, taught by Norwegian instructors, began in December. The men received lectures and demonstrations on skiing techniques and most had mastered the basics in two weeks. At this point the men were made to ski cross-country in formation from dawn until dusk with all of their equipment until they were up to Norwegian army standards.

As a light infantry unit destined for alpine or winter combat it was issued various items of non-standard clothing, equipment and rations, including skis, parkas, haversacks and the Mountain ration. From the outset, the 1st Special Service Force was armed with a variety of non-standard or limited-issue weapons, such as the M1941 Johnson machine gun. The Johnson light machine gun in particular helped greatly increase the firepower of the unit and was highly regarded by those who used it in combat. Frederick's staff even considered arming the men with blow darts but it was decided against on the grounds that it may have been considered a war crime. Frederick himself participated in the design of a fighting knife made exclusively for the force called the V-42 combat knife, a derivative of the Fairbairn–Sykes fighting knife.

Name, insignia and uniforms
While carrying out beachhead operations at Anzio, legend has it that a member of the force uncovered the journal of a German lieutenant from the Hermann Goering Division. The journal contained the following entry: "The Black Devils are all around us every time we come into the line. We never hear them come." This legend was never verified as fact by any member of the brigade; however, the force was known as the Black Devils and as the Devil's Brigade. The members of the brigade preferred the latter. General Frederick had cards printed up with the unit's insignia on them and the words  or "The worst is yet to come" printed in red ink down the right side which the force would leave on the bodies of dead Germans as a form of psychological warfare. This was so effective that Sergeant Victor Kaisner reported hearing a German soldier whisper  ("Black Devil") as the German's throat was being sliced on the beachhead. However, recent historiography surrounding the unit debates whether or not Frederick and his general staff made up the nickname in order to instill fear in the enemy.

The unit was unofficially first known as the "Braves". Their spearhead shoulder insignia was chosen with this name in mind. The formation patch was a red spearhead with the words USA written horizontally and CANADA written vertically. The branch of service insignia was the crossed arrows formerly worn by the U.S. Army Indian Scouts. The unit wore red, white, and blue piping on their garrison cap and on the breast an oval (or trimming) behind their Parachutist Wings. Members of the unit also wore a red, white, and blue fourragère, lanyard, or shoulder cord made out of parachute suspension lines.

American members of the force arrived for training in Helena in standard U.S. Army attire: green twill coveralls, some wearing khaki pants and fatigue hats. Others were dressed in trousers and green uniform jackets and wore green caps. Ultimately, however, the American uniforms did not differ widely from one another. The Canadian troops, however, arrived in all different manners of uniform: some wore kilts, others tartan trousers (trews) and others Bermuda shorts. Headgear differed just as widely, depending on where the soldier was from – wedge caps for some, black berets for troops taken from armoured regiments and large khaki Tam o' Shanters for soldiers from Scottish regiments. Under the Williamson-Wickham agreement, Canadian soldiers were issued and wore American uniforms.  Eventually, it was decided that the uniforms would come from an American supplier and olive drab trousers and blouses were issued. Two uniform elements differentiated an American Force member from a Canadian: 1) the collar insignia had either U.S. or Canada above the crossed arrows; and two, the identification disc, aka "dog tags," worn by the soldier (Americans wore American metal ID tags and Canadians wore Canadian ID discs). Frederick instructed MAJ Orville Baldwin to develop a unique fourragère (also known as an aiguillette or lanyard) for all members of the unit, thereby replacing the regimental fourragère worn by the Canadian soldiers.  The result was a braided fourragère made with red, white and blue parachute cord. For mountain warfare, the men were given baggy ski pants, parkas and a helmet. Standard boots were originally the same as those issued to parachuting regiments, but these were substituted with infantry combat boots in Italy.

Colonel Frederick worried from the outset that the soldiers from both countries would have trouble forming a cohesive unit. On a base level, the techniques and commands used by either army were confusing to the other. Commands for marching, for example, had to be homogenized in order for the unit to operate in the field effectively. In order to satisfy the men from both countries, compromises were made. Canadian bagpipers were put into American unit marching bands to play "Reveille" every morning. The marching styles and commands of the American and Canadian armies were mixed and uniforms were made identical. In the end, Frederick's fears were unfounded as the men bonded through training and dedication to the force.

Unit awards, legacy and memorials

Unit awards 
The First Special Service Force was awarded the French Croix de Guerre with Silver-Gilt Star, as well as the Distinguished Unit Citation for extraordinary heroism. A large number of the "Devil's Brigade" members were honored for their acts of valor, including Tommy Prince, Canada's most decorated First Nations soldier of World War II. Also, U.S. member Wendell C. Johnson (Fifth Company, Third Regiment, serial # 37 168 437), risking his life to save a fellow Black Devil, walked into a minefield and brought his brigade comrade to safety. When they tried to give him a medal for his act of heroism, Wendell declined saying, "Give it to the man who lost his leg".

Descendant units 
The 1st Special Service Force is claimed as a direct ancestor by two modern special operations units; the Canadian Special Operations Regiment (CSOR) of the Canadian Special Operations Forces Command and the elite unit of the 1st Special Forces Command (Airborne) of the United States Army Special Operations Command.

In 1952, Colonel Aaron Bank (a former Jedburgh and Operational Group member of the Office of Strategic Services [OSS] during WW II) became the commander of 10th Special Forces Group (Airborne).  Formal lineage for the 1st Special Forces Regiment (Not to be confused with the 1st Special Forces Group (Airborne)), established in 1958, was from the FSSF. (Special Forces carried the Ranger lineage from 1952 to 1958.)  Much of the training in unconventional tactics, including strategies, and lessons learned, replicated training of the Operation Groups (OG) and Jedburghs of the OSS. In Canada Military Intelligence and Logistical Operations 1952–1988, the Canadian Airborne Regiment 1968–1995 which formed part of the Special Service Force 1977-1995 and today's Canadian Special Operations Regiment, like United States Army Special Forces, trace their roots to the FSSF. Just like in World War II, Canada's elite JTF2 and the United States' elite SFOD-D operators were united once again into a special assignment force for the 2001 invasion of Afghanistan.

In 2006, the Canadian members of the 1st Special Service Force received the United States Army's Combat Infantryman Badge for participation in front-line combat. On 3 February 2015, the FSSF was awarded the Congressional Gold Medal, the highest award congress can give to civilians.

Other memorials 
In 1996, Interstate 15 in Montana between Helena and Sweet Grass was renamed the "First Special Service Force Memorial Highway". This highway was chosen because it was the route taken in 1942 by the Canadian volunteers to join their American counterparts for training at Fort Harrison. The entire length of Alberta Highway 4 received the same name in 1999.

The force is also memorialized in several commemorative plaques mounted in city halls and along the route they fought in Italy and Southern France, including one outside the Protestant Cemetery, Rome, next to the Pyramid of Cestius and another on the Embassy of the United States in Rome, facing Via Vittorio Veneto.

U.S. Army Special Forces Tab 
When the Special Forces Tab was created in 1983 for wear by members of the U.S. Army Special Forces, it was also retroactively awarded to members of wartime combat units that had been identified as predecessors of the Special Forces.  Thus, any soldier who had spent 120 days in wartime service with the First Special Service Force is authorized to wear the Special Forces Tab.

Media depictions
The Devil's Brigade is a 1968 film starring William Holden, Cliff Robertson, and Vince Edwards, focusing on the force's training and deployment to Italy.

The 1968 film Anzio featured Peter Falk as Corporal Jack Rabinoff, who identified himself to co-star Robert Mitchum as a member of the American-Canadian 1st Special Service Force.

Three documentaries have been made about the force: "Black Devils" in 2000, an episode of History Channel's "Dangerous Missions" series, written produced and directed by Darryl Rehr; Daring to Die: The Story of the Black Devils, written and directed by Greg Hancock and Wayne Abbot, and Devil's Brigade, a 2006 TV miniseries produced by Frantic Films.

In November, 2019, a Bravery In Arms documentary was produced of the First Special Service Force assault on Monte Majo. In the documentary, the actual location of the battle was shown.

Quentin Tarantino's 2009 film Inglourious Basterds features a character named Lt. Aldo Raine aka "Aldo the Apache" played by Brad Pitt who wears the unit's crossed arrows collar insignia and red arrowhead shoulder patch. Tarantino cited the 1SSF as an influence.

The Devil's Brigade by Robert H. Adleman & George H. Walton is an autobiography and historical reference for the First Special Service Force.

The Marvel Comics character Wolverine claimed several times that he was a member of the Devil's Brigade during the war — being Canadian-born during the last years of Queen Victoria's reign, it fits. He also claimed he took part in Anzio and Cassino battles.

Footnotes

Bibliography

Books
 
 
 Cottingham, Peter Layton Once Upon a Wartime: A Canadian Who Survived the Devil's Brigade (P.L. Cottingham, Manitoba Canada, 1996)
 
 Hope, Tom, ed. Bonding for Life: The post World War II story of the elite strike brigade, First Special Service Force  (First Special Service Force Association, 2007) 
 
 
 
Peppard, Herb (1994). The Light Hearted Soldier: A Canadian's Exploits with the Black Devils in WWII. Halifax, Nova Scotia: Nimbus Publishing. ISBN 1551090678 . 
 
 
 Stanton, Shelby, World War II Order of Battle: An Encyclopedic Reference to U.S. Army Ground Forces from Battalion through Division, 1939-1946 (Revised Edition, 2006), Stackpole Books 
 
 Wickham, Kenneth. "An Adjutant General Remembers" (Adjutant General's Corps Regimental Association, 1991).
 
 Wood, James A. We Move Only Forward: Canada, the United States, and the First Special Service Force, 1942–1944 (St. Catharines, Ontario: Vanwell Publishing, 2006).

External links

 First Special Service Force

1942 establishments in Canada
1942 establishments in the United States
1944 disestablishments in Canada
1944 disestablishments in the United States
Airborne units and formations of the United States Army
Aleutian Islands campaign
Canada–United States military relations
Italian campaign (World War II)
Military units and formations disestablished in 1944
Military units and formations established in 1942
Army units and formations of Canada in World War II
Military units and formations of the United States Army in World War II
Multinational army units and formations
Special forces of Canada
Special operations units and formations of the United States Army